The Audie Award for Original Work is one of the Audie Awards presented annually by the Audio Publishers Association (APA). It awards excellence in narration, production, and content for an audiobook not recorded from a pre-existing book or play released in a given year. It has been awarded since 1996.

Winners and finalists

1990s

2000s

2010s

2020s

References

External links 

 Audie Award winners
 Audie Awards official website

Original Work
Awards established in 1996
English-language literary awards